Abrashino is a rural locality (a village) in Nizhnekamensky Selsoviet of Ordynsky District, Novosibirsk Oblast, Russia. The population was 37 as of 2010. There are 6 streets.

Geography 
Abrashino is located 57 km southwest of Ordynskoye (the district's administrative centre) by road. Ust-Khmelyovka is the nearest rural locality.

References 

Rural localities in Novosibirsk Oblast